Curt Strasheim is a former American football coach.  He was the head football coach at Southwest Minnesota State University in Marshall, Minnesota, serving for four seasons, from 2000 to 2003, and compiling a record of 14–30.

Head coaching record

References

Year of birth missing (living people)
Living people
American football quarterbacks
Millersville Marauders football coaches
Southwest Minnesota State Mustangs baseball players
Southwest Minnesota State Mustangs football coaches
Southwest Minnesota State Mustangs football players
South Dakota State Jackrabbits football coaches
Western Illinois Leathernecks baseball coaches
Wisconsin–Stout Blue Devils football coaches
People from Granite Falls, Minnesota
Players of American football from Minnesota
Baseball players from Minnesota